Wudaokou station is a station on Line 13 of the Beijing Subway. As its name suggests, it is situated in the Wudaokou area of Haidian District.

Station Layout 
The station has 2 elevated side platforms.

Exits 
There are 2 exits, lettered A and B, which are both accessible.

References

External links

Beijing Subway stations in Haidian District